Five Acre School is a private pre-school and elementary school next to the Dungeness Wildlife Refuge in Sequim, Washington state.  The School was founded in 1994 by Bill and Juanita Jevne and is currently a 501c3 non-profit organization.

Five Acre School serves children from three to twelve.  The school has four classrooms: the Primary Class (pre-school), the Discovery Class (kindergarten and 1st grade), the Adventure Class (2nd and 3rd grade) and the Explorer Class (4th, 5th and 6th grade).  There are ten faculty and staff including a director.

The school focuses on the arts, the outdoors and project-based learning.  Every Wednesday students go on day hikes in the woods and beaches around the school. Students have art and music several times throughout the week.

Five Acre School is known for its marimba band called Soundwaves. The band performs songs written by Walt Hampton at various events and festivals in Clallam County. The band is directed by Rosie Sharpe.

References

Schools in Clallam County, Washington